Ton du Chatinier (born 13 January 1958) is a retired Dutch football player. He later worked as an assistant manager to Hong Myung-bo of South Korea, and alongside Hong as an assistant to manager Guus Hiddink at Russian side FC Anzhi Makhachkala. He currently manages Iranian club Khooneh be Khooneh in Azadegan League (Second tier).

Playing career

Club
Du Chatinier was born in Utrecht and during his professional career, he played as a defender for his hometown club FC Utrecht only. His career was cut short by a groin injury.

Managerial career
Du Chatinier took over as a head coach at Utrecht from Willem van Hanegem at the end of 2008, and was sacked by the club at the end of the 2010–11 season after missing out on the playoffs for a ticket to play European football. He also managed Dutch amateur sides Spakenburg, Elinkwijk and Kozakken Boys.

In summer 2016, he was named manager of AFC for a third time.

Honours
FC Utrecht
 KNVB Cup: 1984–85

See also
 List of one-club men

References

External links
 Profile

1958 births
Living people
Footballers from Utrecht (city)
Dutch footballers
Association football defenders
FC Utrecht players
Eredivisie players
Dutch football managers
Amsterdamsche FC managers
USV Elinkwijk managers
Kozakken Boys managers
FC Utrecht managers
Eredivisie managers
SV Argon managers
Dutch expatriate football managers
SV Spakenburg managers